"Bangpakok Wittayakom School" is a public school located in  Bangkok, Thailand. The school admits secondary students, grades 7 to 12, aged 11–18. The previous name of the school was Mattayom Wat Bangpakok School.

History
Bangpakok Wittayakom school was initiated by พระครูประศาสน์ สิกขกิจ (phra-kru-sas sik-ka-kij), an abbot of Wat Bangpakok. He wanted the ministry of education to open a school in Bangpakok district. So, he used the 2nd floor of disciplined building of the Wat Bangpakok for teaching in the beginning. Bangpakok Wittayakom School was open for grade 11 on 17 May 1949 for the first time.

Later, ล้อม ฟักอุดม (lom fuk-u-dom), บุญนาคร มังคะลี (boon-na-korn mung-ka-lee) and ถนอม เอี่ยมทศ (ta-nhom iam-tos) bought a land, gave it to Wat Bangpakok and transferred ownership to Department of General Education. Then on 3 January 1951, the school was moved to a new school building on the 9600 m2 land. In 1964, ล้อม ฟักอุดม (lom fuk-u-dom) donated an additional land 4,048 m2 to the school. Now, Bangpakok Wittayakom school has an area of approximately 12,000 m2. In 1974, Bangpakok Wittayakom school was approved to open for high school curriculum.

The school won the ASEAN quiz, organised by the Thai Ministry of Foreign Affairs to commemorate ASEAN’s 41st Anniversary, on 8 August 2008.

Curriculum
The major programmes at Upper Secondary level include:
 TEP Science- Mathematics (2 Classes)
 Science- Mathematics (5 Classes)
 TEP English - Mathematics (1 Class)
 English - Mathematics (2 Classes)
 English - Chinese, French and Japanese (1 Class)

References

External links
 

Schools in Bangkok
Educational institutions established in 1949
1949 establishments in Thailand